Bolshoye Zakozye is a rural locality (a village) in Nikolotorzhskoye Rural Settlement, Kirillovsky District, Vologda Oblast, Russia. The population was 18 as of 2002.

Geography 
Bolshoye Zakozye is located 22 km northeast of Kirillov (the district's administrative centre) by road. Dulovo is the nearest rural locality.

References 

Rural localities in Kirillovsky District